Back to Love is the ninth studio album by Beth Nielsen Chapman.  It was released in the United Kingdom on January 24, 2010 and in the United States on May 25, 2010. The song "How We Love" was covered by Joe McElderry in 2012 for his fourth studio album, Here's What I Believe.

Track listing

"Hallelujah" (Beth Nielsen Chapman, Darrell Scott) – 4:14
"I Can See Me Loving You" (Chapman, Scott) – 3:33
"Even As It All Goes By" (Chapman, Annie Roboff) – 3:10
"How We Love" (Chapman) – 3:55
"I Need You Love" (Chapman) – 3:50
"More Than Love" (Chapman, Danny Flowers) – 3:57
"Happiness" (Chapman) – 3:02
"I'll Give My Heart" (Chapman, Benmont Tench) – 3:14
"Shadows" (Chapman) – 3:57
"Peace" (Chapman, Michael McDonald) – 3:40
"The Path of Love" (Chapman) – 4:02

Personnel 

Martin Allcock – bass
David Angell – violin
Monisa Angell – viola
Carrie Bailey – violin
Zeneba Bowers – violin
Nick Brofy – loop programming
Pat Buchanan – electric guitar
Judith Burrows – art direction, photography
Victor Caldwell – bass
John Catchings – cello
Seanad Chang – viola
Beth Nielsen Chapman – bouzouki, engineer, guitar, organ, piano, piano engineer, producer, vocal engineer, vocals
Gary Cirimelli – engineer
Phil Cunningham – box, whistle
Janet Darnall – violin
David Davidson – violin
Chris Farrell – viola
Danny Flowers – guitar, 12 string guitar, Telecaster
Brian Foraker – mastering
Jim Grosjean – viola
Erin Hall – violin
Carolyn Huebel – violin
Craig Krampf – drums, percussion
Anthony LaMarchina – cello
David Leonard – engineer, mixing, string engineer
Gary Malkin – piano
Carl Marsh – conductor, horn arrangements, string arrangements
Michael McDonald – piano
Adam Muñoz – piano engineer, vocal engineer
Joe Murphy – euphonium, trombone, tuba
Eilidh Patterson – backing vocals
Dave Polmeroy – bass
Brian Pruitt – drums, percussion
John Ragusa – piccolo, trumpet
Sari Reist – cello
Annie Roboff – producer, Wurlitzer
Andrew Scheps – piano engineer, vocal engineer
David Schober – string engineer
Darrell Scott – bouzouki, guitar, acoustic guitar, electric guitar, mandolin, slide guitar, soloist, backing vocals
Pam Sixfin – violin
Greg Strizek – engineer
Heather Sturm – engineer
Benmont Tench – piano
Wei Tsun Chang – violin
Felix Wang – cello
Don Ward – design
Karen Winkelmann – string contractor, violin

2010 albums
Beth Nielsen Chapman albums